Boophis axelmeyeri is a species of frogs in the family Mantellidae. It is endemic to Madagascar. 

It is named after the evolutionary biologist and zoologist Axel Meyer.

References

 Vences, M., Andreone, F., Rabibisoa, N.H.C. & Cox, N. 2009. Boophis axelmeyeri. 2012 IUCN Red List of Threatened Species.  Downloaded on August 23, 2012.

axelmeyeri
Amphibians described in 2005
Endemic frogs of Madagascar